Simon Manuel is a professional rugby league footballer who played in the 2000s. He played at representative level for Ireland, and at club level for Kilkenny Wildcats.

International honours
Manuel won a cap for Ireland while at Kilkenny Wildcats 2004 1-cap (sub).

References

Ireland national rugby league team players
New Zealand people of Irish descent
New Zealand rugby league players
Living people
Place of birth missing (living people)
Year of birth missing (living people)